Prairie Pioneers is a 1941 American Western "Three Mesquiteers" B-movie directed by Lester Orlebeck.

Cast 
 Robert Livingston as Stony Brooke
 Bob Steele as Tucson Smith
 Rufe Davis as Lullaby Joslin
 Esther Estrella as Dolores Ortega
 Robert Kellard as Roberto Ortega
 Guy D'Ennery as Don Miguel Ortega
 Davison Clark as Don Carlos Montoya
 Jack Ingram as Henchman Wade
 Kenneth MacDonald as Fields (as Ken MacDonald)
 Lee Shumway as Nelson
 Mary MacLaren as Martha Nelson
 Yakima Canutt as Henchman Morrison

References

External links 

1941 films
1941 Western (genre) films
American Western (genre) films
American black-and-white films
Republic Pictures films
Three Mesquiteers films
Films directed by Lester Orlebeck
1940s English-language films
1940s American films